Milestone is the fifth studio album by American R&B recording artist Chrisette Michele. It was released on June 10, 2016, by Caroline Records and Rich Hipster. It was supported by the singles: "Steady", "Unbreakable" and "Equal". It peaked at number seventy-three on US Billboard 200.

Release and promotion
Milestone was released through Payne's label Rich Hipster and Caroline Records on June 10, 2016, in both standard and deluxe editions. Standard edition contains twelve tracks while deluxe edition contains seven bonus tracks. Also, artworks are different between those two editions. Album was promoted with three singles. The lead single was titled "Steady". It was released on December 4, 2015. "Unbreakable", the second single, was released three months later on March 4, 2016. The third single "Equal" was released a week before Milestone, on June 3, 2016.

To further promote Milestone, Payne embarked on Milestone Tour in 2016.

Commercial performance
Milestone peaked at number seventy-three on US Billboard 200 while reaching top five on Top R&B/Hip-Hop Albums, peaking at number five.

Critical reception

Joe Nelson from Singersroom stated that the album shows eclectic growth: "The album starts off promising but tapers off towards the end.  Milestone shows a range of music styles, going from a trap-inspired records to something for the grown and sexy. “Steady” permeates the trap sound in the vein of Janelle Monáe’s "Yoga." Records including "Meant To Be" and "Soulmate" represent Chrisette's signature R&B sound." In summary Nelson concluded that: "All in all, Milestone is worth a listen. Is it a dominating album that will have your mind blown?  Hmm, that’s subjective; for some, the theme may (sonically) seem all over the place, but it’s respectable in many ways; the album features clean production, and Chrisette Michele still showcases she’s a dominating talent with her wide range of vocals. It’s an understandable mixture of sounds and themes because it displays her growth as an artist, an individual, and business woman who’s letting her creative freedom shine as an indie label artist/owner. From this point forward, her success is more or less in her own hands, so only time will tell what the outcome will be."

Track listing

Charts

Weekly charts

Year-end charts

References

2016 albums
Chrisette Michele albums
Caroline Records albums